Ramvichar Netam is an Indian politician who has served as a Member of Parliament in Rajya Sabha, the upper house of the Indian Parliament from Chhattisgarh. He was a member of the Chhattisgarh Legislative Assembly from Ramanujganj and served as Cabinet Minister in Raman Singh's ministry. In 2015 Amit Shah appointed Netam as a National Secretary in his National Team, and in 2016 he was appointed as Co- Incharge of Jharkhand state B.J.P With Trivendra Singh Rawat.

On 29 May 2016, he was nominated as the BJP candidate from Chhattisgarh for the Rajya Sabha elections on 11 June.

References

Living people
People from Balrampur district, Chhattisgarh
1962 births
Rajya Sabha members from Chhattisgarh
Bharatiya Janata Party politicians from Chhattisgarh
Chhattisgarh MLAs 2008–2013